Vriesea carinata is a plant species in the genus Vriesea.

The bromeliad is endemic to the Atlantic Forest biome (Mata Atlantica Brasileira), located in southeastern Brazil.

Cultivars
Garden cultivars include:
 Vriesea 'Brachystachys-Splendens'
 Vriesea 'Cardinalis'
 Vriesea 'Christiane'
 Vriesea 'Crimson Glow'
 Vriesea 'Karamea Tipsy'
 Vriesea 'Kienastii'
 Vriesea 'Lucille'
 Vriesea 'Main Roads'
 Vriesea 'Mariae'
 Vriesea 'Marjolein'
 Vriesea 'Medio-Rosea'
 Vriesea 'Morreniana'
 Vriesea 'Nitida'
 Vriesea 'Pendant'
 Vriesea 'Pulchella'
 Vriesea 'Rose Marie'
 Vriesea 'Saffron Flame'
 Vriesea 'Serene'
 Vriesea 'Sweet One'
 Vriesea 'Tenuis'
 Vriesea 'Versaillensis'
 Vriesea 'Witte Senior'

References

BSI Cultivar Registry . retrieved 11 October 2009

carinata
Endemic flora of Brazil
Flora of the Atlantic Forest
Garden plants of South America